Guangdong-Hong Kong Cup 2003–04 is the 26th staging of this two-leg competition between Hong Kong and Guangdong.

The first leg was played in Hong Kong Stadium while the second leg was played in Guangzhou.

Hong Kong captured champion again by winning an aggregate 2–1 against Guangdong.

Squads

Hong Kong
Some of the players in the squad include:
  Lawrence Chimezie Akandu 羅倫士
  Cheung Sai Ho 蔣世豪
  Law Chun Bong 羅振邦
  Poon Yiu Cheuk 潘耀焯

Guangdong
The team was formed mainly by players from Jia B League 2003 third-placed team Guangzhou Xiangxue.  The rest of the team include a few players from Guangzhou Kejian and Tan Ende from Zhejiang Lücheng.
Some of the players in the squad include:
  Chen Qian 陳謙
  Dai Xianrong 戴憲榮
  Feng Junyan 馮俊彥
  Huang Zhiyi 黃志毅
  Li Zhihai 李志海
  Li Zhixing 黎智星
  Li Zifei 黎梓菲
  Liang Jingwen 梁敬文
  Liang Shiming 梁仕銘
  Luo Yong 羅勇
  Tan Ende 譚恩德
  Wen Xiaoming 溫小明
  Yang Xichang 楊熙昌
  Yang Zhi 楊智
  Ye Zhibin 葉志彬
  Zhang Yuntao 張雲濤

Results
First Leg

Second Leg

Trivia
 It was the first time in 13 thirteen years that Hong Kong was able to capture the champion with a team without any foreign players.

References
 HKFA website 省港盃回憶錄(十) (in chinese)
 HKFA website 近5屆省港盃回顧(二) (in chinese)

 

2004
2003 in Chinese football
2004 in Chinese football
2003–04 in Hong Kong football